Campos is a surname of Spanish and Portuguese origin, meaning "Fields" in both languages. Notable people with the surname include:

A–F 
Adrián Campos (1960–2021), Spanish racing driver
Adrián Campos Jr. (born 1988), Spanish racing driver
Ángelo Campos (born 1993), Peruvian football player
Alex Campos (born 1976), Colombian singer
Álvaro de Campos, one of Fernando Pessoa's various heteronyms
Andrey Campos (born 1978), Costa Rican football player
António Campos (1922–1999), Portuguese film director
Arsenio Martínez Campos (1831–1900), Spanish military officer and revolutionary
Bruno Campos (born 1973), Brazilian actor
Carlos Campos Sánchez (1937–2020), Chilean football player
Carlos Campos (disambiguation), several people
Daniel Campos (disambiguation), several people
Dave Campos (born 1942), American motorcycle racer
David Campos (born 1970), American attorney
Derek Campos (born 1988), American mixed martial artist
Djalma Campos (born 1987), Angolan-Portuguese football player
Ederson Honorato Campos (born 1986), Brazilian football player
Edinho Campos (born 1983), Brazilian football player
Emilio Campos (born 1954), Venezuelan football player
Enrique Campos (born 1961), Venezuelan bicycle racer
Felipe de Souza Campos (born 1981), Brazilian football player
Florencio Molina Campos (1891–1959), Argentine illustrator and painter
Francisca Campos (born 1985), Chilean mountain biker

G–N 
Gualberto Campos (born 1981), Venezuelan football player
Haroldo de Campos (1929–2003), Brazilian poet and translator
Héctor Campos Parsi (1922–1998), a Puerto Rican composer
Henrique Campos (1909–1983), Portuguese film director
Jayro Campos (born 1984), Ecuadorian football player
Javier Campos (born 1947), Chilean writer
Jeaustin Campos (born 1971), Costa Rican football player and coach
Jorge Campos (born 1966), Mexican football player and coach
Jorge Luis Campos (born 1970), Paraguayan football player
Jorge Sammir Cruz Campos (born 1987), also known as Sammir, Brazilian-Croatian footballer
José Campos (disambiguation), several people
Juan Morel Campos (1857–1896), Puerto Rican composer
Julieta Campos (1932–2007), Cuban-Mexican writer
Leonel Campos (born 1987), Venezuelan baseball player
Liliana Campos (born 1971), Portuguese television presenter and model
Marco Campos (1976–1995), Brazilian racing driver
Mario Campos López (born 1943), Mexican chess master
Matías Campos (born 1989), Chilean football player
Nora Campos (born 1965), American politician
Nuno de Campos (born 1969), Portuguese painter

O–Z
Orlando Campos (1925–1994), Indian bridge player
Pablo Campos (born 1983), Brazilian football player
Paul Campos, American professor and author
Paulo Campos (1921–2007), Filipino physician and educator
Paulo Mendes Campos (1922–1991), Brazilian writer and journalist
Pedro Albizu Campos (1891–1965), Puerto Rican politician
Pete Campos, United States politician
Purita Campos (1937–2019), Spanish cartoonist and painter
Rachel Campos-Duffy (born 1971), American television personality
Roberto Campos (1917–2001), Brazilian economist
Roel Campos (born 1949), United States lawyer
Rui Campos (1922–2002), Brazilian football player
Santiago E. Campos (1926–2001), American judge
Tatica Campos (born 1892), Cuban baseball player
Tony Campos (born 1973), American musician
Tomás Campos (born 1975), Mexican football player
Valerie Campos (born 1983), Mexican artist
Wlnsvey Campos (born 1995), American politician

Portuguese-language surnames